Titans of Investing, commonly referred to as Titans, is an elite collegiate program founded and led by lauded investor Britt Harris.

The program consists of a semester course, a professional fraternity, and a think tank. It is modeled on Benjamin Franklin's Junto and emphasizes "wisdom, personal understanding, and growth" through "collaboration, civil discourse, and a sincere search for truth". Its mission is to infuse high-achieving students with wisdom, and instill a life path of "success to significance" rather than pursuing "success after success", which is also modeled on Franklin's "do well by doing good." Titans is funded by over 80 individual and corporate sponsors. Graduates are referred to as "Titans", nationally recognized for "excellence, intellect, and integrity", and highly recruited by employers. As of Fall 2021, the alumni network consists of 700 Titans.

History

Genesis 
The impetus for Titans began in the spring of 2005 while Britt Harris, a devout Christian, was the chief executive officer of Bridgewater Associates; the largest hedge fund in the world at that time. After nearly two decades in high-stakes wealth management, Harris was suffering from burnout. Seeking relief, a confluence of inquiries into the meaning of life, common good, and greatest literary works culminated in the idea of a collegiate course he called the "Titan Series". The initial concept was to study the top 10 books and the top 10 practitioners in each key business area (i.e., management, investing, accounting, economics, et cetera). Before resigning from Bridgewater, Harris queried 70 peers throughout business, academia, and politics for the most influential books on their careers. With a compiled list of over 200 books, Harris returned to his alma mater at Texas A&M University in the fall of 2005.

Development 
Throughout the 2005 fall semester and 2006 spring semester, Britt Harris recruited a select group of students from Texas A&M University to help organize, examine, and distill over 200 literary works to their core concept, then develop the course curriculum. The group, "Titans 0", included Cason Beckham, Will Carpenter, Jason Kaspar, Matt Ockwood, Ty Popplewell, Andrew Robertson, and Thomas Marriott who had just finished redeveloping the Aggie Investment Club. Influenced by his mentor Bob Buford, Harris infused the course with the philosophy of living a life of "success to significance" rather than pursuing "success after success". Employing the very concept of Titans (timeless wisdom), Harris modeled the course structure on Benjamin Franklin's Junto to emphasize "wisdom, personal understanding, and growth" through "collaboration, civil discourse, and a sincere search for truth".

The curriculum was finished and adopted by Mays Business School as Titans Course (FINC 427) in the summer of 2006. The first class, "Titans 1", launched in the 2006 fall semester and graduated the first 15 Titans: Jon Boben, Andy Cronin, Scott Deyerle, Justin Evans, Bryan Farney, Robert Fletes, Graham Gilkerson, Daniel McMaster, Payal Patel, David Phillips, Cherise (née Kaspar) Ratliff, Steven Smith, Michelle Stukey, Bryan Sweeney, and Xuan Yong.

Growth 
As Titans graduated, the collaboration and camaraderie cultivated inside the classroom continued after into the Titans Fraternity that spans 23 states and 11 countries. As of May 2019, the alumni network consists of 542 Titans from 34 classes.

In September 2016, a chapter was established at the Hankamer School of Business of Baylor University. In January 2018, a chapter was established at the McCombs Business School of University of Texas at Austin.

The book summaries produced by the Titans Course evolved into an acclaimed think tank called "Titans Briefs". Titans Briefs are freely released into the public domain. As of May 2019, the digital archive features 415 briefs.

Administration 
The Titans of Investing program is led by Britt Harris, who also serves as professor of the Titans Course, and operated by its students.

Student positions include:

 Network Program Manager 
 Wisdom Program Manager 
 Reach Program Manager 
 Finance Program Manager

The Titans Fraternity is operated by the Titans Alumni Network.

The program is overseen by an advisory board consisting of Harris, alumni, Texas A&M faculty, and industry dignitaries.

Membership 
Membership is exclusive, but applications are open to all majors, gender, race, and religion. Each semester, 15 slots per chapter are competed for. Requirements include: resume, essays, interviews with alumni, and up to nine nominations. Membership is free courtesy of over 80 individual and corporate sponsors.

Applicants are vetted for:

 Likely to be successful early in career
 Have the character to use whatever success they do achieve for the benefit of others
 Interesting and fully engaged people — Britt Harris believes “If you are extremely smart but only partially engaged, you will be outperformed by people who are sufficiently smart but fully engaged, and should be.”

Course 
Class is held once a week for two hours. It consists of professor led and class-directed instruction, alternating weekly.

The semester course consists of:

 Seven modules:

 Long-term market characteristics
 Market theory; efficient markets versus behavioral finance
 Successful active management methods
 Policy development
 Hedge fund strategies
 Emerging markets
 Benjamin Franklin's Preeminence of Wisdom and the Rareness of an Intentional Life

 Review of seventeen Titans Briefs
 Creation of one Titans Brief
 Development and management of an active investment portfolio
 Weekly presentation and review of economic reports are presented each week
Guest speakers
 Bi-weekly class dinners hosted by the Professor, Britt Harris

Fraternity 
Titans Fraternity is a professional fraternity (not to be confused with Greek social fraternities or honor societies) that is cultivated among classmates during the Titans Course, and continued after graduation in the Titans Alumni Network. During the course, classmates engage in civil discourse and social interaction over dinner at the Titans Clubhouse. Annual dinners for all Titans are held in Austin, Dallas, Houston, New York and London.

Think tank 
Book summaries produced by the Titans Course developed into an acclaimed think tank called "Titans Briefs". Titans Briefs are freely released into the public domain. As of May 2019, the digital archive features 415 briefs.

Chapters

Texas A&M University 
Titans was established at Texas A&M University in August 2006. It is hosted at Mays Business School and the semester course is FINC 427/669. As of May 2019, it has graduated 28 classes consisting of 441 Titans.

Baylor University 
Titans was established at Baylor University in September 2016. It is hosted at Hankamer School of Business and the semester course is BU4M. As of May 2019, it has graduated 4 classes consisting of 51 Titans.

University of Texas at Austin 
Titans was established at University of Texas at Austin in January 2018. It is hosted at McCombs Business School and the semester course is FIN 372. As of May 2019, it has graduated 3 classes consisting of 48 Titans.

Alumni Network 
The Titans Alumni Network is hosted through Linkedin to emphasize and continue the professional fraternity cultivated at each collegiate chapter. Through the network, Titans have open access to all graduates and help each other with career advancement.

Notable alumni

External links 

 Titans of Investing website
 Titans Briefs

See also 

 Harvard Student Agencies
 Yale Entrepreneurial Society

References 

Student organizations established in 2006
Student societies in the United States
Texas A&M University
Baylor University
University of Texas at Austin
Business organizations